The Crystal Casino was the first permanent government-owned casino in the Western Hemisphere. It opened in 1990 on the seventh floor of Fort Garry Hotel in Winnipeg, Manitoba, and was run by the Manitoba Lottery Foundation. Two new gaming centers, the McPhillips Street Station and the Regent Station, were opened in 1993 to replace Crystal's bingo halls. It was closed on May 22, 1997, with the two other Winnipeg casinos absorbing its operations.

See also
 List of casinos in Canada

References

Casinos in Manitoba
Casinos completed in 1990
1990 establishments in Manitoba
1997 disestablishments in Manitoba
Defunct casinos in Canada